Arnhem is a city and municipality in the Netherlands.

Arnhem may also refer to:

 Vitesse Arnhem, a Dutch Football (soccer) club
 Arnhem Land, the northeastern region and Aboriginal Land Council of the Northern Territory, Australia
 Arnhem (ship), a 17th-century Dutch vessel
 Arnhem Highway, in the Northern Territory, Australia, between Jabiru and Darwin
 Electoral division of Arnhem, an electoral division in the Northern Territory Legislative Assembly, Australia
 Battle of Arnhem, a World War II Allied military operation of 1944
 Arnhem (video game), a battle strategy game based on the Battle of Arnhem
 Arnhem, a typeface designed by Fred Smeijers

People
 Edith Arnheim (1884–1964), Swedish tennis player
 Fritz Arnheim (1866–1922), German historian
 Gus Arnheim (1897–1955), American band leader
 Rudolf Arnheim (1904–2007), German American author
 Walter Arnheim (born 10 October 1944), American businessman and non-profit manager

See also 
 Arnheim (disambiguation)